Club Sportiv Speranța Jucu, commonly known as Speranța Jucu, is a Romanian football club based in Jucu, Cluj County, currently playing in the Liga IV, the fourth tier of the Romanian football league system. The club was originally founded in 1974, under the name of Unirea Jucu, and for most of its existence played at amateur level, until 2013, when "jucanii" promoted to Liga III. The football club of Jucu played at the level of third tier between 2013 and 2017, when it was dissolved and then re-established in the fifth tier, under the name of Speranța Jucu.

History

Amateur leagues
Speranța Jucu was founded in 1974, under the name of Unirea Jucu, and played for 39 years at amateur level, Liga IV and Liga V. In 2013 the team won Liga IV-Cluj County and went to the promotion play-off when they beat Satu Mare County champion, Someșul Cărășeu 1-0.

Liga III
In their three Liga III seasons they finished on 8th, 7th and 4th place. In the summer of 2016 the club almost withdrew from Liga III after Jucu Municipality withdrew some funding, but a new investor bought the club and set an ambitious target, promotion to Liga II. In the summer of 2017, the club was dissolved due to financial problems, but re-founded in the same period as Speranța Jucu and enrolled in the fifth tier.

Honours
Liga IV – Cluj County
Winners (1): 2012–13

References

External links
 CS Speranța Jucu at frf-ajf.ro
 Soccerway profile

Football clubs in Romania
Sport in Cluj County
Football clubs in Cluj County
Association football clubs established in 1974
Liga III clubs
Liga IV clubs
1974 establishments in Romania